The Ambassador Extraordinary and Plenipotentiary of Peru to the Federative Republic of Brazil is the official representative of the Republic of Peru to the Federative Republic of Brazil.

Relations between both countries were established in 1826, and have continued since.

List of representatives

See also
List of ambassadors of Brazil to Peru
List of ambassadors of Peru to Portugal

References

Brazil
Peru